Shirang Rural District is a rural district (dehestan) in Kamalan District, Aliabad County, Golestan Province, Iran. At the 2006 census, its population was 12,339, in 2,767 families.  The rural district has 14 villages.

References 

Rural Districts of Golestan Province
Aliabad County